A bandana is a cloth also known as a kerchief.

Bandana or bandanna may also refer to:

Bandana (pop band)
Bandana (country band)
Bandana, Kentucky, a small town in the United States
Bandana (album), second studio album by hip hop duo MadGibbs
Bandanna, Pennsylvania, unincorporated area in York County, Pennsylvania, United States
Bandanna (opera) by Daron Hagen

See also
Y Bandana, a Welsh alternative rock band
Y Bandana (album), their self-titled debut album